Scott Allen Capurro (born December 10, 1962) is an American comedian, writer and actor based in San Francisco. His comedy material is deliberately provocative, referring often to gay life and culture, politics, race and racism, and popular culture.

Career
In 1994 he was awarded the Perrier Award for best newcomer at the Edinburgh Festival.

In 1999 he played the voice of Beed Annodue along with actor, comedian, and friend Greg Proops in Star Wars: Episode I – The Phantom Menace.

In 2001, Capurro appeared on Australian show Rove Live and shocked the host, Rove McManus, with an explicit routine. Rove apologized immediately after the performance.

In 2002, he presented a light-hearted documentary on the UK's Channel 4 called The Truth About Gay Animals which examined the subject of homosexuality in animals. Capurro visited various collections of captive animals to observe animals which had been reported to exhibit homosexual behaviour, and interviewed the staff about this. The show also included an interview with anti-gay rights campaigner  and politician, Janet Young, where Capurro showed Young a video of a variety of male-male intercourse and female-female mating attempts in various animal species, and then asked her to comment on whether this influenced her views about its "unnaturalness".

Capurro has been a frequent guest on the Sarah & Vinnie's Morning Show of Radio Alice 97.3FM KLLC San Francisco. He is also a regular panelist on the topical discussion series The Wright Stuff, hosted by his friend Matthew Wright.

Capurro is managed by comedy agency The Comedy Bar.

From May to June 2008, he acted the role of Sammy in Joe DiPietro's play Fucking Men in London, England.

He has a husband named Edson, and lives in San Francisco. He spends most of his time abroad in England, and tours consistently.

Film roles

Television appearances

Stage appearances

Footnotes

References

External links
 Official Scott Capurro website
 Radio Alice 97.3FM San Francisco
 Scott's Agent – The Comedy Bar

1962 births
20th-century American comedians
21st-century American comedians
American stand-up comedians
American expatriates in Scotland
American gay actors
Living people
Gay comedians
American LGBT broadcasters
Male actors from San Francisco
Comedians from California
American LGBT comedians
Writers from San Francisco